The Tournoi de Paris, also known as Trophée de Paris, was a pre-season association football invitational competition hosted by French club Paris Saint-Germain at their home ground Parc des Princes in Paris, France. The competition was founded in 1957 by former hosts Racing Paris to celebrate their 25th anniversary. The inaugural 1957 edition is considered a precursor of both the Intercontinental Cup and FIFA Club World Cup.

Regarded as French football's most prestigious friendly tournament, the Tournoi de Paris was initially held by Racing Paris between 1957 and 1966. It briefly returned in 1973 with new organizers Paris FC before PSG successfully relaunched the competition in 1975. Abandoned in 1993 for financial reasons, PSG revived it in 2010 for the club's 40th anniversary. Renamed Trophée de Paris in 2012, this was the last edition to date.

Vasco da Gama won the inaugural Tournoi de Paris in 1957, while Barcelona won the last edition in 2012. Paris Saint-Germain is the most successful club in the competition's history, having lifted the trophy on seven occasions. Belgian outfit Anderlecht is next on the title count with three, while fellow French club Racing Paris and Brazilian sides Santos and Fluminense were the only other teams to win the competition more than once. PSG arch-rivals Marseille is among a group of clubs to win the tournament once.

History

From Racing to PSG

The Tournoi de Paris was founded in 1957 by former hosts Racing Paris to celebrate their 25th anniversary. The Parisian side invited European champions Real Madrid, Brazilian team Vasco da Gama and German outfit Rot-Weiss Essen to the tournament played at Parc des Princes. Its inaugural edition, won by Vasco after defeating Alfredo Di Stéfano's Real Madrid in the final, prompted the creation of the Intercontinental Cup in 1960 as an official, UEFA/CONMEBOL-endorsed European/South American club contest.

From 1957 to 1993, four teams (including the hosts) played in a knockout format. The Tournoi de Paris featured two semi-finals, a third-place play-off, and a final. The tournament was held annually each summer between 1957 and 1966 by Racing Paris. It briefly returned in 1973, with Paris FC as the new hosts. Following Paris FC's failed attempt to relaunch the competition, Paris Saint-Germain and club president Daniel Hechter successfully did so in 1975. Reinforced with Dutch legend Johan Cruyff and Serbian star Dragan Džajić for the occasion, PSG narrowly lost to Spanish side Valencia in the final in front of a sold-out Parc des Princes. The following edition was worse as PSG lost both matches and finished last.

First PSG title
The 1978 edition proved to be the most unbalanced of them all. A few weeks before the 1978 FIFA World Cup, PSG invited the national football teams of Netherlands and Iran. The Clockwork Orange won the competition with ease, hammering Club Brugge in the final (7–1). PSG finally won the tournament in 1980. Dominique Bathenay's last-minute equalizer from the penalty spot in a 4–4 thriller versus Standard Liège sent the game to the penalty shoot-out, where PSG clinched its first Tournoi de Paris. The capital club retained the trophy in 1981.

In 1982, Brazilian team Atlético Mineiro inflicted PSG's biggest defeat ever in the tournament as the capital club bowed out in the semi-finals (0–3). PSG reclaimed the title in 1984 and 1986, before a catastrophic 1987 edition in which the club finished last for the first time since 1976. The defeat to Dinamo Zagreb would be the last conceded by the Parisians in 90 minutes. Since then, PSG have only been beaten on penalties.

Between 1975 and 1993, only one edition of the tournament was cancelled. It was in 1990 due to the poor condition of the pitch. The Rolling Stones' concert at Parc des Princes, a few weeks earlier, was to blame. The Tournoi de Paris returned in 1991 and saw PSG's last match with historic shirt sponsor RTL. The 17-year collaboration ended as PSG claimed third place against Sporting CP. In 1993, François Calderaro's solitary goal against AJ Auxerre gave PSG its second consecutive title and seventh overall. This would turn out to be the last edition of the tournament until 2010 and PSG's last title to date. The club abandoned the Tournoi de Paris for financial reasons.

Current status

PSG revived the Tournoi de Paris in 2010 to commemorate its 40th anniversary. Ahead of the tournament, PSG unveiled "Allez Paris Saint-Germain," to the tune of "Go West" by Village People, and a lynx called Germain as the club's official anthem and mascot, respectively. The Parisian side invited Porto, Roma and Girondins de Bordeaux. Modeled off Arsenal's Emirates Cup, the competition switched to a group-stage format for the 2010 edition. PSG defeated Porto (1–0) and shared the points with Roma (1–1), while Bordeaux were held by Roma (1–1) and downed Porto (2–1). Both French clubs finished with four points, but Bordeaux scored more goals and won the Tournoi de Paris on goal difference.

Not held in 2011, the tournament was renamed Trophée de Paris in 2012. It featured a single prestigious match against Barcelona. The Spanish side lifted the trophy, winning on penalties (1–4) after the match ended in a draw (2–2) at Parc des Princes. Rafinha and Lionel Messi from the penalty spot gave Barcelona a comfortable lead, before PSG's Zlatan Ibrahimović and Zoumana Camara forced a penalty shoot-out. This was the tournament's last edition to date.

Records and statistics

Finals

Performances by club

References

External links

Official websites
PSG.FR - Site officiel du Paris Saint-Germain
Paris Saint-Germain - Ligue 1
Paris Saint-Germain - UEFA.com

Paris Saint-Germain F.C.
Defunct international club association football competitions in Europe
French football friendly trophies
International club association football competitions hosted by Paris
1957 establishments in France
Recurring sporting events established in 1957